George South (born 1962) is an American wrestler.

George South may also refer to:
George South (solicitor) (1916–1988), British lawyer and philatelist
George South Jr., wrestler, see Richie Steamboat
George South (jockey) in Paumonok Handicap

See also